Kangdez (literally "Fortress of Kang") is a legendary fortress in Iranian mythology, which resembles paradise.

References

Sources 
 

Iranian mythology